Lev M. Bregman (1941 - 2023) is a Soviet and Israeli mathematician, most known for the Bregman divergence named after him.

Bregman received his M. Sc. in  mathematics in 1963 at Leningrad University and his Ph.D. in mathematics in 1966 at the same institution, under the direction of his advisor Prof. J. V. Romanovsky, for his thesis about relaxation methods for finding a common point of convex sets, which led to one of his most well-known publications.

Bregman's Theorem, proving a 1963 conjecture of Henryk Minc, gives an upper bound on the permanent of a 0-1 matrix.

Bregman was employed at the Institute for Industrial Mathematics, Beer-Sheva, Israel, after having spent one year at Ben-Gurion University of the Negev, Beer-Sheva. Formerly, during 1966-1991, he was senior researcher at the Leningrad University.

Bregman is author of several text books and dozens of publications in international journals.

See also
 Institute for Industrial Mathematics, Beer-Sheva, Israel
 home page at Institute for Industrial Mathematics, Beer-Sheva, Israel

References

External links
 Bregman's Theorem at Theorem of the Day.

1941 births
Mathematicians from Saint Petersburg
Israeli mathematicians
Living people
Saint Petersburg State University alumni